Kim Joong-soo (born April 17, 1960) is a former badminton player and coach from South Korea.

Kim was a member of the Korean men's team that won gold at the 1986 Asian Games.

In 1991, Kim married two-time World Champion Chung Myung-hee.

Kim is better known as a coach.  After several years coaching the national team in the 1990s, he became the head coach of the national team after the Sydney Olympics and held the post until he was replaced by Sung Han-kook in December 2010.  He served briefly as the interim head coach after Sung was dismissed in August 2012 but in early 2013, Lee Deuk-choon was named as a permanent replacement.

Achievements

IBF World Grand Prix 
The World Badminton Grand Prix sanctioned by International Badminton Federation (IBF) from 1983 to 2006.

Men's doubles

References 

South Korean male badminton players
Asian Games medalists in badminton
1960 births
Living people
Badminton players at the 1986 Asian Games
Asian Games gold medalists for South Korea
Badminton coaches
Medalists at the 1986 Asian Games